Abdelmalek Mokdad (born 5 May 1986) is an Algerian professional footballer who plays as a midfielder for Championnat National 2 club Chambly.

Club career
On 6 July 2011, Mokdad signed a one-year contract with Emirati club Ittihad Kalba.

On 18 July 2012, Mokdad returned to Algeria and signed a two-year contract with JS Kabylie.

Mokdad returned to Créteil in July 2018. In 2022, he signed for Chambly.

Honours
MC Alger
 Algerian Championnat National: 2009–10

References

External links
 
 
 
 

1986 births
Living people
Algerian footballers
Algerian expatriate footballers
Expatriate footballers in France
Association football forwards
French sportspeople of Algerian descent
US Créteil-Lusitanos players
FC Chambly Oise players
MC Alger players
Ligue 2 players
Championnat National players
Championnat National 2 players
Algerian Ligue Professionnelle 1 players
Algeria A' international footballers
People from Bouïra Province
Algerian expatriate sportspeople in the United Arab Emirates
Expatriate footballers in the United Arab Emirates
Al-Ittihad Kalba SC players
JS Kabylie players
RC Arbaâ players